Margaret Mary Macdonald was a Canadian politician. On May 29, 1961 she became the first woman to represent Prince Edward Island in the House of Commons of Canada.

She first won representation for the electoral district of King's at the House of Commons in a by-election in 1961, a seat vacated by the death of her husband John Augustine Macdonald. Macdonald successfully retained her seat in the 1962 federal election. She was defeated by Liberal John Mullally in the 1963 federal election.

References

External links
 

1910 births
1968 deaths
People from Halifax, Nova Scotia
Progressive Conservative Party of Canada MPs
Members of the House of Commons of Canada from Prince Edward Island
Women members of the House of Commons of Canada
Women in Prince Edward Island politics
20th-century Canadian women politicians
20th-century Canadian politicians